The dorsal digital veins from the adjacent sides of the fingers unite to form three dorsal metacarpal veins, which end in a dorsal venous net-work opposite the middle of the metacarpus.

They are a popular site for peripheral venous cannulation because they tend to be prominent veins which are easily accessible and do not lie over a point of flexion - so are not too uncomfortable for the patient.

Veins of the upper limb